Kefalovryso is a village and a community of the Pogoni municipality. Before the 2011 local government reform it was a part of the municipality of Ano Pogoni, of which it was a municipal district and the seat. The 2011 census recorded 838 residents in the village. The community of Kefalovryso covers an area of 15.831 km2.

History 

The Greek newspaper Pigi Kefalovrysou mentioned in an article that in 1840 this village was founded by a lone tselingas (Greek for goatherd) named Nastas (Greek: ο τσέλιγκας Νάστας).  Kefalovryso passed from the Ottoman Empire to Greece in 1913, during the Balkan Wars.

In the 10th of July a massacre happened in the village. 22 men were put in two houses, with most of them being soldiers from the Greco-German war. Only one of them survived and the rest were burnt alive.

Geography
It is situated at the foot of mount Nemertsika, near the Albanian border. It is 3 km west of Vasiliko, 12 km northeast of Delvinaki, 16 km west of Konitsa, 36 km east of Gjirokastër (Albania) and 46 km northwest of Ioannina.

Facilities
In Kefalovryso, there is a primary school, a lyceum, a minor soccer team, a gymnasium, a church, a small post-office and a square in the centre with the town hall of Ano Pogoni. The factory that produces most of the Greek euro coins is located in Kefalovryso.

Historical population

See also
List of settlements in the Ioannina regional unit

External links
Kefalovryso private website
https://web.archive.org/web/20021226231048/http://www.geocities.com/athens/ithaca/1473/
Kefalovriso 
Photos from Kefalovryso, Ioannina

References

Aromanian settlements in Greece
Populated places in Ioannina (regional unit)